The Bystraya Sosna is a river in Oryol and Lipetsk oblasts in Russia. The river is usually frozen over from the end of November until the end of March.

The towns of Livny and Yelets are along the river.

References

Rivers of Lipetsk Oblast
Rivers of Oryol Oblast